The Anthem of the Bulgarian Education, also known as "Forward, Revived Peoples" is the official anthem of the Saints Cyril and Methodius' Day in Bulgaria. The lyric of the song was based on a poem by Stoyan Mihaylovski.

History

Creation of the lyrics 
The song was based on a poem by a teacher on the French language at Rousse Gymnasium, Stoyan Mihaylovski. On May 15, 1892, he wrote the enthusiastic poem "Hymn of St. Cyril and Methodius", with the first verse "Go, revived people". The song was published as a "Project for a Bulgarian All-Kind School Anthem" in the 9th until 10th issue of Misŭl Magazine and is dated to "Rousse, 1892 Aprile 15".

Creation of the music 
Nine years later, in 1901, Panayot Pipkov, a music teacher at the Hunters School, was commissioned to write a new song that students would sing on the coming church day of Cyril and Methodius on May 11. He still does not find the right text and is constantly postponing. On May 9, Pipkov notices that one of the boys is concentrating on reading a poem in his hour, taking his book and respecting it. Before it reaches half the poem, the music for the ordered student song is already born in his head. Takes the chalk and begins to record the notes on the board. In 15 minutes, he composes the melody, and by the end of the class, his students study it and sing. The school celebrity sings her whole school.

Dissemination 
On May 11, 1901 the song "Go, People Revived" was first performed in Lovech as a festive anthem for the praise of the work of Cyril and Methodius and the Bulgarian education. In 1902, for the Day of Bulgarian Education and Culture and the Slavonic Scripture, the song is littered and singing from all schools in the country.

After the communists took power, the obligatory ideological changes were brought about by the song. Some lines have been changed, couples have been removed, mentioning God and the apostles. Whole quotes are completely removed from readers.

It was not until the 1990s, after the democratic changes in the country, that the original text was restored. But traditionally the school holidays continue to perform the first 6 pairs of the 14 poems.

References

Bulgarian songs
National symbols of Bulgaria
Cyrillo-Methodian studies